Laildo Ribeiro Machado (born 10 October 1952) is a Brazilian rower. He competed at the 1980 Summer Olympics and the 1984 Summer Olympics.

References

External links
 

1952 births
Living people
Brazilian male rowers
Olympic rowers of Brazil
Rowers at the 1980 Summer Olympics
Rowers at the 1984 Summer Olympics
Place of birth missing (living people)
Pan American Games medalists in rowing
Pan American Games gold medalists for Brazil
Rowers at the 1979 Pan American Games
Medalists at the 1979 Pan American Games